is a satirical mahjong manga by Hideki Ohwada. It was initially irregularly serialized in the Kindai Mahjong Original manga magazine published by Takeshobo, then switched to bimonthly serialization on Takeshobo's other mahjong manga magazine Kindai Mahjong in April 2009. An anime adaptation was released on February 26, 2010 as an original video anime. The premise of the manga is that international diplomacy is settled on the mahjong table, with real-life politicians depicted as masters of mahjong. The Japanese title is a parody of Junichiro Koizumi's slogan, .


Volume list

References
General

Citations

Mudazumo Naki Kaikaku